The 1993–94 NHL season was the 77th regular season of the National Hockey League. The league expanded to 26 teams with the addition of the Mighty Ducks of Anaheim and the Florida Panthers. The New York Rangers defeated the Vancouver Canucks in seven games to become the Stanley Cup champions. It was the Rangers' fourth championship overall, and their first in 54 seasons, since 1939–40.

The spectacular play of Dominik Hasek of the Buffalo Sabres ushered in a new era of goaltending dominance in the NHL. Only three teams reached the 300-goal plateau, and only one team, the Detroit Red Wings, averaged more than four goals scored per game. Goaltenders combined for 99 shutouts during the regular season, a mark that broke the all-time regular-season record of 85 set in 1974–75.

League business
For this season, the names of the conferences were changed from Campbell and Wales to Western and Eastern respectively, and the divisions' names were changed from Adams, Patrick, Norris, and Smythe to Northeast, Atlantic, Central, and Pacific respectively. Each division had changes. The Northeast Division would welcome the Pittsburgh Penguins, previously from the Patrick Division. The Atlantic Division would welcome the newcomer Florida Panthers and the Tampa Bay Lightning, previously from the Norris Division. The Central Division would welcome the Winnipeg Jets, previously from the Smythe Division. The Pacific Division would welcome the newcomer Mighty Ducks of Anaheim. New league commissioner Gary Bettman, who had previously worked in the National Basketball Association (NBA), thought the old names could be confusing to non-traditional fans and believed that a change to geographically-named divisions, as used in the NBA and most other North American professional sports, would be more easily understandable to new fans.

In addition, the playoff format was changed to a conference based seeding over division specific brackets: the division winners were seeded one-two by order of point finish, then the top six remaining teams in the conference were seeded three through eight. However, unlike the NBA, the NHL matched the highest-seeded winners against the lowest-seeded winners in the second round. In order to reduce the number of long trips to and from the West Coast, whenever a Central Division team played a Pacific Division team in the playoffs, the format was 2–3–2 rather than the traditional 2–2–1–1–1, a format that was only used for the 1993–94 season.

Franchise changes
The Mighty Ducks of Anaheim and the Florida Panthers started play this season.
The Minnesota North Stars relocated to Dallas, Texas to become the Dallas Stars. It was the first franchise relocation for the NHL since the Colorado Rockies became the New Jersey Devils in 1982–83.
This was the first season that the San Jose Sharks actually played in San Jose, moving into the new San Jose Arena after spending their first two years at the Cow Palace in nearby Daly City.
It was the final season that the St. Louis Blues played at the St. Louis Arena and the Chicago Blackhawks played at Chicago Stadium.

Regular season
The Panthers and Mighty Ducks set new records for first-year expansion teams. Both teams finished with 33 wins, surpassing the 31 wins of the Philadelphia Flyers and Los Angeles Kings in 1967–68. That mark would not be topped by another expansion team until the Vegas Golden Knights notched their 34th win in their inaugural season on February 1, 2018, finishing with 51 wins. The Panthers also set a high-water mark in points, with 83 points, surpassing the previous record set by the Flyers' 73 points in 1967–68. The Golden Knights would eventually shatter this inaugural expansion team record by 26 points notching a total of 109 points in 2017–18.

The division winners qualify for the playoffs as 1–2 seeding. The next six per conference are the teams with the six best records of the non-division winners.

Final standings

       No = Division rank, CR = Conference rank, W = Wins, L = Losses, T = Ties, GF = Goals For, GA = Goals Against, Pts = Points

       Teams that qualified for the playoffs are highlighted in bold.

Playoffs

Bracket

Awards
The NHL awards presentation took place on June 16, 1994.

All-Star teams

Player statistics

Scoring leaders

Leading goaltenders

Milestones

Debuts

The following is a list of players of note who played their first NHL game in 1993–94 (listed with their first team, asterisk(*) marks debut in playoffs):
Chris Osgood, Detroit Red Wings
Jason Arnott, Edmonton Oilers
Kirk Maltby, Edmonton Oilers
Rob Niedermayer, Florida Panthers
Chris Pronger, Hartford Whalers
Donald Brashear, Montreal Canadiens
Jason Smith, New Jersey Devils
Zigmund Palffy, New York Islanders
Mattias Norstrom, New York Rangers
Todd Marchant, New York Rangers
Alexandre Daigle, Ottawa Senators
Alexei Yashin, Ottawa Senators
Pavol Demitra, Ottawa Senators
Markus Naslund, Pittsburgh Penguins
Jocelyn Thibault, Quebec Nordiques
Ian Laperriere, St. Louis Blues
Chris Gratton, Tampa Bay Lightning
Yanic Perreault, Toronto Maple Leafs
Michael Peca, Vancouver Canucks
Jason Allison, Washington Capitals

Last games

The following is a list of players of note who played their last game in the NHL in 1993–94 (listed with their last team):
Gordie Roberts, Boston Bruins
Dave Christian, Chicago Blackhawks
Michel Goulet, Chicago Blackhawks
Mike Foligno, Florida Panthers
Brian Propp, Hartford Whalers
Dave Taylor, Los Angeles Kings
Keith Acton, New York Islanders
Rob Ramage, Philadelphia Flyers
Bryan Trottier, Pittsburgh Penguins

Trading deadline
Trading deadline: March 21, 1994.
March 19, 1994: Donald Dufresne traded from Tampa Bay to Los Angeles for Los Angeles's sixth round pick in 1994 Entry Draft.
March 19, 1994: Jeff Daniels traded from Pittsburgh to Florida for Greg Hawgood.
March 19, 1994: Doug Zmolek and Mike Lalor traded from San Jose to Dallas for Ulf Dahlen.
March 21, 1994: Joe Juneau traded from Boston to Washington for Al Iafrate.
March 21, 1994: Craig Janney traded from Vancouver to St. Louis for Jeff Brown, Bret Hedican and Nathan Lafayette.
March 21, 1994: Jim Johnson traded from Dallas to Washington for Alan May and Washington's seventh round pick in 1995 Entry Draft.
March 21, 1994: Joe Reekie traded from Tampa Bay to Washington for Enrico Ciccone and Washington's third round pick in 1994 Entry Draft and a conditional draft pick.
March 21, 1994: Steve Konroyd traded from Detroit to Ottawa for Daniel Berthiaume.
March 21, 1994: Phil Bourque traded from NY Rangers to Ottawa for future considerations.
March 21, 1994: Tony Amonte and the rights to Matt Oates traded from NY Rangers to Chicago for Stephane Matteau and Brian Noonan.
March 21, 1994: Peter Andersson traded from NY Rangers to Florida for future considerations.
March 21, 1994: Robert Dirk traded from Vancouver to Chicago for Chicago's fourth round pick in 1994 Entry Draft.
March 21, 1994: Mike Gartner traded from NY Rangers to Toronto for Glenn Anderson, the rights to Scott Malone and Toronto's fourth round pick in 1994 Entry Draft.
March 21, 1994: Craig MacTavish traded from Edmonton to NY Rangers for Todd Marchant.
March 21, 1994: Paul Ysebaert traded from Winnipeg to Chicago for Chicago's third round pick in 1995 Entry Draft.
March 21, 1994: Alexei Kasatonov traded from Anaheim to St. Louis for Maxim Bets and St. Louis' sixth round pick in 1995 Entry Draft.
March 21, 1994: Mike Needham traded from Pittsburgh to Dallas for Jim McKenzie.
March 21, 1994: Kevin Todd traded from Chicago to Los Angeles for Los Angeles's fourth round pick in the 1994 Entry Draft.
March 21, 1994: Pelle Eklund traded from Philadelphia to Dallas for future considerations.
March 21, 1994: Roy Mitchell and Reid Simpson traded from Dallas to New Jersey for future considerations.
March 21, 1994: Steve Passmore traded from Quebec to Edmonton for Brad Werenka.

Neutral site games
As a part of the 1992 strike settlement, the NHL and Bruce McNall's Multivision Marketing and Public Relations Co. organized 26 regular season games in cities without a franchise as a litmus test for future expansion.

The Stars played a neutral-site game in their previous market of Minnesota at the Target Center in Minneapolis, where they were greeted enthusiastically. The Minnesota North Stars' tradition of playing on New Year's Eve and holding a post-game skate on the ice was also continued with a game between the Flyers and Bruins.

The Lightning vs. Red Wings contest in Minneapolis was scheduled for Martin Luther King Day, a Monday, with an afternoon face-off at 2:05 PM. However, due to an error on the NHL's part, the Lightning believed themselves to be playing at 7:35 PM, an error that was only discovered two weeks prior to the game by reporters. The Lightning ended up playing an 8:05 PM game in Winnipeg, flying back to the U.S., and playing again 18 hours later in Minneapolis.

The Panthers, in the midst of a playoff race, played a March "home" game against the Maple Leafs 30 miles from Toronto, at Hamilton.

Complete list of neutral-site games

Coaches

Eastern Conference

Western Conference

See also
List of Stanley Cup champions
1993 NHL Entry Draft
1993 NHL Expansion Draft
1993 NHL Supplemental Draft
45th National Hockey League All-Star Game
National Hockey League All-Star Game
NHL All-Rookie Team
Ice hockey at the 1994 Winter Olympics
1993 in sports
1994 in sports

References
 
 
 
 
Notes

External links
Hockey Database 1994 season

 
1993–94 in Canadian ice hockey by league
1993–94 in American ice hockey by league
1994 in American sports